Drudkh is a Ukrainian black metal band. All four also belonged to Blood of Kingu until it was disbanded. Their lyrics and artistic themes embrace Slavic mythology and Ukrainian nationalism. Many of the band's lyrics are derived from the works of nineteenth- and twentieth-century Ukrainian poets (Oleksandr Oles, Oleh Olzhych, Maik Yohansen, etc.) and especially Taras Shevchenko.

Drudkh have been particularly secretive throughout the course of their career, even for a black metal band, giving no interviews and not releasing the lyrics to several of their albums. From their conception until 2009, Drudkh did not have any official website, but in May 2009, Season of Mist launched an official Myspace, operated by the label rather than the band.

History
Drudkh has released eleven albums, two EPs, four splits, and two compilations of material from the band's early splits and EPs. Their early releases were released on CD through the English extreme metal record label Supernal Music, with the exception of the EP (which was a vinyl release), and, again with the exception of the EP, on vinyl through two Finnish black metal labels, Northern Heritage and Faustian Distribution. More recent releases have been through Season of Mist, which has also issued remastered versions of the band's earlier albums as digipaks.

The band's first album, Forgotten Legends, was released on August 18, 2003. The album establishes the band's trademark epic sound; its three tracks and one outro span nearly forty minutes, with the longest track, "False Dawn", nearing the sixteen-minute mark. Terrorizer included Forgotten Legends in its Top 40 Black Metal albums list.

Autumn Aurora followed on November 28, 2004. While continuing its predecessor's general mood and atmosphere, it distinguishes itself by incorporating synthesizers and other such keyboard instruments. Autumn Aurora has frequently been cited as Drudkh's finest album, although some fans give the nod to the later Blood in Our Wells. This record had a strong critical success: for example, it was chosen as the best album of the year by Chronicles of Chaos web-zine.

After Autumn Aurora, Amorth (drums, keyboards) joined the band and replaced Yuriy.

The Swan Road (Лебединий шлях), released on March 14, 2005, marked a departure in a number of ways. It was well-reviewed and is the first Drudkh album to have Ukrainian lyrics, all of which are adapted or taken directly from the work The Haidamakas (1841) by Taras Shevchenko, narrating about the Ukrainian anti-Polish uprising of 1768. Its CD booklet included prints of Shevchenko's notebooks, which many non-Ukrainian-speaking fans mistook for song lyrics. The addition of Shevchenko's poetry can also be said to have given Drudkh's music a more pronounced nationalistic leaning, a move continued on the next album.

On March 23, 2006, Drudkh released Blood in Our Wells (Кров у наших криницях), once again through Supernal Music, in a deluxe edition (limited to 1000 hand-numbered copies) and a normal CD edition. On this album, poetry from four nineteenth- and twentieth-century Ukrainian poets (including Oleksandr Oles and Lina Kostenko) serves as lyrical material, and the album itself was dedicated to Stepan Bandera, leader of the Organization of Ukrainian Nationalists. Musically, the album adds progressive rock influences and increased use of traditional heavy metal soloing into the mix, while retaining the band's tradition of blending black metal and Ukrainian folk music. Because several tracks sample the Ukrainian poetic film Mamay (2003), the album has greater use of cinematic elements than its predecessors. It was Drudkh's first record to appear in the Terrorizer Top 40 year list, placing at number 35.

After the release of Blood in Our Wells, Amorth was exiled from the band, and new members Krechet (bass) and Vlad (drums) joined.

On October 19, 2006, Drudkh released Songs of Grief and Solitude (Пісні скорботи і самітності). This release is composed of folk music, with much of the music containing melodic elements from previous Drudkh compositions (for example, "The Cranes Will Never Return Here" is based on a riff from "Solitude" on Blood in Our Wells, and "Archaic Dance" is based on a riff from "Glare of 1768" on The Swan Road). It is entirely instrumental, with barely any drumming, and prominently features wind instruments. The album received mixed reviews, with some fans criticizing the band for reusing old material, and others praising the band's radical reconstruction of its own sound.

On April 16, 2007, Supernal Music released Drudkh's Anti-Urban, a 45-RPM 10 inch coloured vinyl limited to 999 hand-numbered copies containing exclusive tracks available only to Supernal Music customers. Season of Mist later re-released it as a mini CD in 2009 as part of the deluxe box-set edition of Microcosmos, and it was also included on the band's collection Eastern Frontier in Flames.

The band's next release, a full-length black metal album titled Estrangement (Вiдчуженiсть), was released on August 25, 2007, again as a limited deluxe edition (1000 hand-numbered copies) and as a normal CD. The album, which had the working title River of Tears, had been rumored to have a "Burzumic" feel before its release, and in some ways, this was borne out by the album's release; its songs were in many ways significantly more minimalistic than those on Blood in Our Wells. Its lyrics were based completely on the 1931-1932 works of Ukrainian poet Oleh Olzhych. Reception to the album has been largely positive, with many fans hailing it as a return to the band's roots or praising the band's musicianship demonstrated in the album's many solos. Notably, the album also featured the band's first prominent use of blast beats since The Swan Road. A spoken introduction in the first track is taken from the 1995 Ukrainian feature film  about Bandera's life and assassination.

In Autumn 2008, the band signed with the French label Season of Mist. On June 22 (July 14 in the United States), 2009, the seventh Drudkh album Microcosmos was released through the label Underground Activists, published by Season of Mist. The standard CD version is a digipak; a limited edition box set also contained an MCD re-release of Anti-Urban. The lyrics are once again taken from Ukrainian poets, like Ivan Franko, Oleh Olzhych, or Bohdan Rubchak. The outro is sampled from Assassination. The album was praised by critics, ranking eleventh in Terrorizers Top 40 Albums of 2009 and third in Haunting the Chapel's (Stereogum's metal section) Top 30 Metal Albums of 2009.

In November 2009, Season of Mist began re-releasing Drudkh's whole catalogue, starting with remastered reissues of Forgotten Legends and Autumn Aurora, and finishing with new editions of Songs of Grief and Solitude and Estrangement in June 2010.

Drudkh's eighth full-length album, Handful of Stars (Пригорща зірок), was released on September 21, 2010, via Season of Mist. Critics and fans noticed the changes in style and sound: it was much clearer than previous efforts and bore influence from post-rock. The record received mixed reviews as a result, though it appeared in Haunting the Chapel Top 50 Albums of 2010 at 8 position. Again, for lyrics was used the poetry of Ukrainian authors, such as Oleksa Stefanovych and Svyatoslav Gordynskyj. The release of the new Drudkh full-length was supported with Slavonic Chronicles mini album, which consisted of two covers of Master's Hammer and Sacrilegium. It was released as a CD only with a deluxe edition of Handful of Stars and also as 10" LP including a download card to get the digital version of the record. As opposed to Handful of Stars, Slavonic Chronicles was much more stylistically similar to their older works like Blood in Our Wells.

The post-rock direction, that was present at Handful of Stars, has been developed in a new project titled Old Silver Key by Drudkh members with French musician Neige of Alcest on vocals. This supergroup signed to Season of Mist and released debut record titled Tales of Wanderings on September 16 (September 27 in North America), 2011.

Drudkh's album Eternal Turn of the Wheel, recorded in summer 2011, was released on February 24 (March 13 in North America), 2012, through Season of Mist.

Drudkh's tenth album, A Furrow Cut Short, was released on April 20, 2015.

Politics
Drudkh has been accused of being a National Socialist black metal (NSBM) band. The band has denied this, and also denies links to fascism or any other political ideology. However, Hate Forest, Saenko's previous band, was more explicitly involved in the NSBM scene, and Drudkh's music has referenced the Ukrainian Insurgent Army, a Ukrainian nationalist formation from World War II that committed ethnic cleansing. One reference is the sixth and final track of the album Blood in Our Wells being titled "Ukrainian Insurgent Army", named after the entity founded by the Bandera faction of the Organization of Ukrainian Nationalists. Said album was also dedicated to Stepan Bandera, a Ukrainian nationalist and divisive figure of Ukrainian history.

Regarding NSBM allegations toward Drudkh and his relationship with Saenko, Konstantin Zmievsky, drummer for Khors, stated, "I played with Astrofaes from 1996 to 2000, for four years, and we played black metal with black metal style of lyrics and we’ve never been interested in national socialism or neo-Nazis and stuff like this. Later, I joined Hate Forest... I played with them for maybe two years, we played only one show. I know the guys very well and they’ve never been Nazis or neo-Nazis."

Members

Current
 Roman Saenko (Роман Саєнко) – guitars (2003–present)
 Thurios (Roman Blahykh, Роман Благих) – vocals, guitars (2003–present)
 Krechet – bass (2006–present)
 Vlad (Vladyslav Petrov, Владислав Петров) – drums, keyboards (2006–present)

Former
 Yuriy Synytsky (also session for Lucifugum, 2001–2007; also in Blood of Kingu) – session drums
 Amorth – session drums (2005)

Discography
Studio albums
Forgotten Legends (2003)
Autumn Aurora (2004)
The Swan Road (2005)
Blood in Our Wells (2006)
Songs of Grief and Solitude (2006)
Estrangement (2007)
Microcosmos (2009)
Handful of Stars (2010)
Eternal Turn of the Wheel (2012)
A Furrow Cut Short (2015)
They Often See Dreams About the Spring (2018)
All Belong to the Night (2022)

EPs
Anti-Urban (2007)
Slavonic Chronicles (2010)

Splits
Thousands of Moons Ago / The Gates (2014; split with Winterfylleth)
One Who Talks With The Fog / Pyre Era, Black! (2016; split with Hades Almighty)
Betrayed By The Sun / Mirages (2016; split with Grift)
Somewhere Sadness Wanders / Schnee (IV) (2017; split with Paysage d'Hiver)

Compilations
Eastern Frontier in Flames (2014; compiles the band's material from their EPs and splits to date)
A Few Lines in Archaic Ukrainian (2019; compiles songs from their three most recent splits to date)

References

External links
 Drudkh at Encyclopaedia Metallum
 Drudkh at Last.fm
 Drudkh at Metal Storm

Ukrainian folk metal musical groups
Ukrainian black metal musical groups
Musical groups established in 2003
Musical quartets
Season of Mist artists
Musical groups from Kharkiv